Jackie Wylie was appointed artistic director and Chief Executive of the National Theatre of Scotland in October 2016.

Previously she founded Take Me Somewhere, a Glasgow wide international performance festival based at the Tramway.

Early life 
Wylie was born in Edinburgh in 1980. She received a first class MA in Theatre, Film and Television Studies from the University of Glasgow in 2001  and worked in film and television production until 2004, when she went to work for The Arches in Glasgow. She worked under Andy Arnold as arts programmer then became artistic director in 2008 at the age of 28, becoming the youngest serving director of a major Scottish venue

At the Arches 
Under Wylie, the venue's artistic output shifted from the more traditional productions of the Arches Theatre Company , to supporting and nurturing new Scottish talent. She developed artists like Kieran Hurley, Gary McNair, Rosanna Cade, Rob Drummond, Julia Taudevin and Nic Green, commissioning work that would eventually tour internationally.  Theatre critic Lyn Gardner described the venue under Wylie as “one of the reasons that in recent years Glasgow has become a magnet for young performance-makers...as significant as Battersea Arts Centre in London in the way it nurtures tomorrow.” 

In 2009 Wylie created the Behaviour festival, which brought globally-renowned international artists and companies like Gob Squad, Ann Liv Young, Tim Crouch, Bryony Kimmings, Ontroerend Goed and The TEAM to Glasgow

 Wylie also co-commissioned large-scale performances by internationally established artists such as DEREVO's Natura Morte, and Linder Sterling's 13 hour performance Darktown Cakewalk.

After the Arches 
Wylie was on maternity leave when the venue closed in 2015. She received a research grant from Creative Scotland and Glasgow Life to investigate how to fill the space left by the Arches, resulting in the festival Take Me Somewhere, which will open in 2017. 
 
Wylie was named a Clore Leadership Programme Clore Leadership Programme Fellow in 2016.  In October 2016 she was announced as the third artistic director of the National Theatre of Scotland, after Laurie Sansom and Vicky Featherstone.

References

1980 births
Living people
Artistic directors